Sidney George Hearn (28 July 1899 – 23 August 1963), known as Sid Hearn, was an English first-class cricketer who played for Kent County Cricket Club between 1922 and 1926. He was born in Harbledown, Kent, and died at Chartham, also in Kent in 1963 aged 64.

Hearn played 32 first-class matches in his career, scoring 465 runs as a left-handed batsman and taking 22 wickets as a slow left arm bowler. He played 31 times for the Kent First XI and 45 times for the Second XI in the Minor Counties Championship.

Hearn's nephew Peter played for Kent between 1947 and 1956.

References

External links

1899 births
1963 deaths
English cricketers
Kent cricketers
H. D. G. Leveson Gower's XI cricketers
People from Harbledown